Retroactive overtime (ROT) is an additional amount of money that is awarded when an employee has a combination of overtime and an additional amount of money, such as a commission or a bonus that is guaranteed based upon work requirements. Overtime is required to qualify for retroactive overtime. So, if a salesperson receives a commission, but does not receive overtime, then the employee does not qualify for retroactive overtime.

Computation

Retroactive overtime is computed by using the number of hours of overtime worked for the specified payroll period to look up the coefficient percentages from the coefficient table (Form WH-134). This coefficient percentage is then multiplied by the commission and/or bonus to determine the ROT amount that will be awarded to the employee in addition to the already existing overtime and commission.

The additional amount on money beyond the overtime, the commission or bonus, must be a guaranteed payment to the employee based upon specified work criteria. Here are some examples of some bonuses that qualify and do not qualify.

Qualifying bonuses 
If an employee is awarded a known amount of money for working a certain shift or for working a number of consecutive weeks, that additional amount of money that is paid beyond the regular base pay and overtime will qualify for retroactive overtime if and only if there are also overtime hours paid during the same pay period of the qualifying bonus. You could also consider this to have an OT value of zero and add an additional look-up table value of all zeros for the percentages to use to determine the ROT amount.

Non-qualifying bonuses 
If an employee is awarded a discretionary bonus that is not guaranteed based upon specific work criteria, this bonus does not qualify for retroactive overtime. A good example of this is a Christmas bonus that may be awarded to employees. This is not a guaranteed bonus that the employee will receive for meeting a specified goal but is rather a bonus that is awarded to the employee on the discretion of the company.

See also

 Fair Labor Standards Act
 Overtime
 Effects of overtime

Notes and references

Code of Federal Regulations (CFR) Part 778 of Title 29
Coefficient Table for Computing Extra Half-Time for Overtime, Form WH-134

External links
Code of Federal Regulations (CFR) Part 778 of Title 29
Coefficient Table for Computing Extra Half-Time for Overtime, Form WH-134

Labor rights
Labor relations
Labor history
Business law
Employment compensation
Working time